Pithoragarh Airport, also known as Naini Saini Airport,  is in Pithoragarh, Kumaon, Uttarakhand, India. The airport was constructed in 1991 for administrative use and planned for the operations of Dornier 228 type aircraft. The State Government plans to upgrade it to Category 2C airport under Visual flight rules (VFR) conditions to facilitate operations of ATR-42 type of aircraft. Recently the Helicopter commercial services to Dehradun and Pantnagar have been started. It is 4.5 kilometers from Pithoragarh city centre. But it's not operational at present.

Airline and destination

See also 
 List of airports in India

References

External links 
 Magazine article for NAINI-SAINI Airport
 Photo of Airport

Pithoragarh
Airports in Uttarakhand
1991 establishments in Uttar Pradesh
Airports established in 1991
20th-century architecture in India